The antibodies from lymphocyte secretions (ALS) assay  is an immunological assay to detect active diseases like tuberculosis, cholera, typhoid etc. Recently, ALS assay nods the scientific community as it is rapidly used for diagnosis of Tuberculosis. The principle is based on the secretion of antibody from in vivo activated plasma B cells found in blood circulation for a short period of time in response to TB-antigens during active TB infection rather than latent TB infection.

Procedure of ALS assay
PBMCs were separated from blood on Ficoll-Paque by differential centrifugation and were suspended in 24-well tissue culture plates culture medium. Different dilutions of PBMCs  were incubated at 37 °C with 5% . Culture supernatants were collected at 24, 48, 72, and 96 h after incubation and the supernatants were test against BCG or PPD by ELISA. The ELISA titer indicate the positive or negative result.

Advantages of ALS Assay in TB diagnosis
The diagnosis of TB is most complicated. The routine diagnosis for TB patient is sputum culture based. But culture need 6-8week with 10-20% false positive results. A rapid serological test for diagnosis, follow-up of disease activity, and response to therapy would be useful to clinicians. The purified protein derivative (PPD) skin test (Mantoux test) is an important tool for diagnosis of latent TB infection and disease in the developed world, but it has low predictive value in Bacillus Calmette-Guérin (BCG)–vaccinated individuals, as well as in individuals living in areas where TB is endemic. The low predictive value is a result of cross-reactivity with BCG and atypical mycobacteria, as well as false negative reactions in malnourished children. BCG has been used as an antigen in EIAs in in vitro studies to determine disease activity, but its use was suspended because of difficulties in interpretation, problems differentiating between active or past disease, and low sensitivity and specificity. The antibodies from lymphocyte secretion (ALS) assay was earlier used to detect specific antibody response after oral vaccination with a killed cholera vaccine in healthy adults without any requirement for in vitro antigen stimulation.

The main advantages are:
 High Sensitivity >93 %
 Early detection of active TB
 This method does not require a specimen taken from the site of disease, it also may be useful in diagnosis of paucibacillary childhood TB.
 Secreted antibody may be preserved for long time for further analysis

Pitfalls

This method cannot be applied if Mantoux test (tuberculin skin test) has been done within the last 40 days, because it can hamper the results of the ALS test. This test is used as a complementary test to other tests, e.g. chest X-ray, ESR, CRP, history of contact with active TB case, failure with conventional antibiotic treatment etc.; anti-TB therapy is not provided if only ALS test is positive. The reason is that this method is potentially an early biomarker of active infection. However, if a subject does not show any physical symptoms, the doctors cannot prescribe anti-TB treatment.

References

Biochemistry methods